Elections to Liverpool City Council were held on 8 May 1958.

After the election, the composition of the council was:

Election result

Ward results

* - Councillor seeking re-election

(PARTY) - Party of former Councillor

The Councillors seeking re-election at this election were elected in 1955 for a three-year term, therefore comparisons are made with the 1955 election results.

Abercromby

Aigburth

Allerton

Anfield

Arundel

Breckfield

Broadgreen

Central

Childwall

Church

Clubmoor

County

Croxteth

Dingle

Dovecot

Everton

Fairfield

Fazakerley

Gillmoss

Granby

Kensington

Low Hill

Melrose

Netherfield

Old Swan

Picton

Pirrie

Prince's Park

Sandhills

St. Domingo

St. James

St. Mary's

St. Michael's

Smithdown

Speke

Tuebrook

Vauxhall

Warbreck

Westminster

Woolton

Aldermanic Elections

At the meeting of the City Council on 19 May 1958 the terms of office of twenty of the forty Aldermen expired and the Councillors elected twenty Aldermen to fill the vacant positions for a term of six years.

Reelected Aldermen

References

1958
1958 English local elections
1950s in Liverpool